The Jackson Rhoads is a model of electric guitar, originally commissioned by guitarist Randy Rhoads and produced by Jackson Guitars.

Origin

The Concorde 
Randy Rhoads' first Jackson prototype was the white, pinstriped, asymmetrical Flying V-inspired model built by Grover Jackson, Tim Wilson, and Mike Shannon of Charvel Guitars.

The guitar featured a maple neck and body (neck through body), ebony fretboard, medium frets, Stratocaster style tremolo, and Seymour Duncan pickups. The prototype was the first from the Charvel works to be labeled with Jackson's name.

The guitar was originally slated to be called The Original SIN, but Randy nicknamed it Concorde after the sleek, white supersonic aircraft.

The second Rhoads prototype 
Randy re-designed the next prototype because he felt the shape of the 'Concorde' was not distinctive enough from the traditional Flying V. His solution was to elongate the top 'horn' of the instrument such that the body bore more resemblance to a shark's fin.

The second prototype featured the revised body shape, was black with a gold pickguard, and fixed tailpiece with strings anchored in the body. This guitar featured Grover locking tuners and Seymour Duncan humbucking pickups (TB-4 bridge and a SH-2 neck).

Further prototypes 
Two more prototypes were commissioned (which makes them four in total), another string through body example (later accidentally sold at NAMM). This one was white with gold hardware and reversed shark fin inlays. And, another black and brass tremolo model with reversed shark fin inlays. This fourth prototype is what is displayed in the photo. Rhoads died in a plane crash in March 1982, before these two guitars were completed, and before he could give Grover any feedback. These revised prototypes would become the first guitars sold to the public under the Jackson Guitars brand name.

The ensuing popularity of Randy Rhoads and the Rhoads model helped put Jackson's name on the map.

Notable users 
Vinnie Vincent, formerly of Kiss, was the first professional guitarist to be offered an early Rhoads guitar by Jackson after Rhoads' death, which Vincent used on the Kiss Creatures of the Night and Lick It Up tours from 1982 until 1984. Following Vincent's departure from Kiss, he modified the Rhoads V design by adding a second V at a slight rotation to the first such that it mimics a shadow. Jackson made at least 3 of these Vincent modified Rhoads Vs from 1985 to 1988 for Vincent, and about 25 others were custom ordered and sold. The design would later be copied by Carvin, Ibanez, Washburn Guitars, as well as to numerous boutique brands, all with Vinnie Vincent's cooperation.

In 2001, guitarists Alexi Laiho and Roope Latvala (of Children of Bodom and Sinergy) had their own custom Rhoads, which featured alder bodies, neck-thru construction, 24 frets, ebony fretboard, white binding, and gold hardware including an original Floyd Rose tremolo bridge.  The electronics were the Jackson J-50BC pickup with JE-1000 preamp. The model was called the Jackson Rhoads L/L (L/L for Latvala/Laiho). There were several different finishes, notably Laiho's which was black w/yellow bevels and gold hardware, and Latvala's main Rhoads was black with inverted cross inlays. Jackson released a limited number of the RR24 in the popular black finish with yellow highlights.

Other noted users include 

 Mikael Åkerfeldt of Opeth
 David G. Alvarez of Angelus Apatrida
 Christian Andreu of Gojira
 Ashmedi of Melechesh
 Corey Beaulieu of Trivium
 Matt Bellamy of Muse 
 Kevin Bond of Superjoint Ritual
 Wes Borland of Limp Bizkit
 Phil Campbell of Motörhead
 Robbin Crosby of Ratt – more commonly associated with the Double Rhoads and King V
 Phil Demmel of Machine Head
 Matt Drake of Evile
 Oscar Dronjak of HammerFall
 Marty Friedman of Megadeth – more commonly associated with the Jackson Kelly
 Galder of Old Man's Child and Dimmu Borgir
 Enrik Garcia of Dark Moor
 Andrés Giménez of De La Tierra and A.N.I.M.A.L.
 Hamish Glencross of My Dying Bride
 Jason Gobel of Cynic
 Jadran "Conan" Gonzalez of Exmortus
 Markus Vanhala of Omnium Gatherum and Insomnium
 Kai Hansen of Gamma Ray and Helloween
 Kirk Hammett of Metallica
 Oli Herbert of All That Remains
 Chris Holmes of W.A.S.P. – The L/L model and the RR24 were based on his custom design.
 Scott Ian of Anthrax and Stormtroopers Of Death
 Guillermo Izquierdo of Angelus Apatrida
 The Great Kat
 Andreas Kisser of Sepultura
 Alexi Laiho of Children of Bodom
 Roope Latvala of Children of Bodom and Stone
 Peter Lindgren of Opeth
 Daron Malakian of System of a Down
 Mark Morton of Lamb of God – More commonly associated with his signature Jackson Dominion.
 Christian Münzner of Obscura and Alkaloid
 Pat O'Brien of Cannibal Corpse
 Mille Petrozza of Kreator
 Kristian Ranta of Norther
 Randy Rhoads of Ozzy Osbourne and Quiet Riot
 Samoth of Emperor and Zyklon
 Silenoz of Dimmu Borgir
 Adrian Smith of Iron Maiden – more commonly associated with the strat-shaped Jackson Adrian Smith Signature.
 Dan Spitz of Anthrax – his signature model was a "miniature" version of the Rhoads.
 Nigel "Nig" Swanson of The Exploited
 Michael Sweet of Stryper
 Sam Totman of DragonForce
 Matthew Tuck of Bullet for My Valentine – Jackson Matt Tuck Signature Series Rhoads.

Models 

Jackson currently has 12 different Rhoads models in production. Previous models included the aluminum bodied 'Roswell Rhoads' with crop circle inlays.

USA Select Series 

The basic model in the USA Select Series is the RR1. The RR1 is made of alder with a maple neck-thru design neck. The ebony fretboard has 22 jumbo frets. The RR1 is equipped with two Seymour Duncan humbuckers and a Floyd Rose original 2 point double locking tremolo at the bridge. The RR1 has four variations:

RR1: The standard Rhoads USA made guitar
RR1T: The RR1 with an adjustable string-through-body bridge
RR1 Left-Handed: Left Handed version of the RR1
RR1T Left-Handed: Left Handed version of the RR1T
RR2: Bolt on neck, USA made, Jackson JT580LP bridge, pickup Kent Armstrong JJB-0 bridge, JP-11 neck. (produced 1996–1997)

Pro Series 
The Pro series is the mid-market Rhoads series. RR3, RR5, RR5FR, RR24, and RR24M were made in Japan. Newer models are made in Indonesia.
RR3: RR3 has an alder body and a bolt-on maple neck with 22 jumbo frets on a rosewood fretboard. This model has Seymour Duncan humbuckers in neck and bridge, and a Floyd Rose Licensed Jackson low-profile double-locking tremolo. During 2007, a limited run of 100 were made in ivory (white) with black pinstripes, similar to the finish found on RR5 in ivory. The limited run of RR3 features Duncan Designed humbuckers and String-thru body. Indonesian RR3 models from 2016 onwards have a neck-thru construction and 1000-series Floyd Rose double-locking tremolo.
RR5: RR5 has a maple thru-body neck with alder wings and rosewood fretboard. The main difference between RR5 and RR3 is a neck-thru and a fixed bridge for RR5 vs a bolt-on neck and a floating bridge for RR3. RR5 also features gold hardware, Seymour Duncan TB4 & SH4 humbucker pickups, and a String-thru body. RR5 production years: 2000-2012 japan (six digit serial stamped on last fret YYXXXX ex. 07XXXX=2007).

RR5FR: RR5FR is mostly the same as RR5 except it has a Floyd Rose FRT-O2000 tremolo bridge, black hardware (as opposed to gold), and is available in black, ivory, and pink pearl finishes.
RR24 (discontinued): RR24 has an alder body and a maple neck with an ebony fretboard. This model differs from RR3 and RR5 in that it is a 24 fret guitar. It has a neck-thru body construction and Original Floyd Rose tremolo. This model is fitted with only one pickup (EMG 81) in the bridge position and a single volume control. This model is also available in custom colors.
RR24M (discontinued): RR24M is mostly the same as RR24, but it has a maple fretboard as opposed to the traditional ebony fretboard
RRMG: RRMG has an ebony fretboard on a maple neck, 22 jumbo frets, a Jackson speed neck, a Floyd Rose® Special Double Locking 2-Point Tremolo, an EMG 81 and an EMG 89. The pickups are direct mounted.
RRTMG: RRTMG is mostly the same as RRMG except it has a String-thru body (no Floyd Rose tremolo). T stands for "Thru" models.
RRT-3:(2014)
RRT-5:(2014)

Pro Series Artist Signature 
Kevin Bond Signature (discontinued): This model has a mahogany neck-thru body and 22 jumbo frets. It is fitted with a Seymour Duncan "Iommi" humbucker, and adjustable string-through-body Schaller fine-tuning tailpiece. The Jackson logo is blood red.
Matt Tuck Signature (discontinued): This model has an alder neck-thru body and maple neck (with scarf joint head stock), and 22 jumbo frets. It is fitted with an EMG 81 humbucker at the bridge, and EMG 85 humbucker at the neck.  The bridge is a JT390 adjustable string-through-body type with Sperzel locking die-cast tuners.  This is the only current model with a reversed headstock.

X Series 
The X series RX10D has an alder body with a maple bolt-on neck. The Rosewood fingerboard has 22 frets, and pickups are both Seymour Duncan Designed humbuckers. The bridge is a Jackson double locking tremolo unit.

The Jackson X Series also offers the Jackson RRXT. It has a basswood body with a Through-Body Maple Speed Neck with Tilt-Back Scarf. Pickups: Duncan Designed™ HB-102B Humbucking Bridge Pickup and Duncan Designed™ HB-102N Humbucking Neck Pickup .

Recently (2012) Jackson released a new type of Rhoads. The RRXMG. This guitar held the original Rhoads shape and was rumoured that it was a replacement for the RR24. It has 2 colour choices. Black or white with black pinstripes. The guitar is built from basswood, maple and with 24 XJ (jumbo)frets on a Rosewood fingerboard. It has 2 EMG pickups: An EMG 81 and an EMG 85.

JS Series 
The JS30RR is from the entry level group that is made in India. The body is Indian cedro and has a bolt-on maple neck. It is fitted with two Jackson pickups and an adjustable string-through-body bridge, and the rosewood fretboard has 24 frets. This model was available with a Floyd Rose tremolo as the JS35RR, but was discontinued in 2000. The current JS series offering is the JS32T Rhoads. It's similar to the original JS30RR, with the addition of shark fin inlays on the fretboard. it also had the JS35RR which was an upgraded version of the standard JS30RR

References

External links 

 Jackson Guitars' official website

Randy Rhoads
1981 musical instruments
Randy Rhoads